Michel Konen (24 December 1950 – 17 January 2022) was a Belgian journalist and television presenter. He served as editor-in-chief of RTBF and La Libre Belgique and was subsequently communications director of the political party Humanist Democratic Centre. He died on 17 January 2022, at the age of 70.

References

1950 births
2022 deaths
Belgian journalists
Belgian television presenters
Centre démocrate humaniste politicians